Kim Jin-ho (born December 1, 1961) is a South Korean archer and Olympic medalist.

She competed at the 1984 Summer Olympics in Los Angeles, where she won an individual bronze medal.

She competed in the Asian Games in 1978 winning a gold medal in the individual event and a silver in the team event; in 1982 winning a gold medal in the team event and silver in the individual; and in 1986 winning gold medals in the team and individual 30m and 60m events and silver medals in the individual and individual 70m events.

She currently teaches at the Korea National Sport University.

References

South Korean female archers
Olympic archers of South Korea
Archers at the 1984 Summer Olympics
Olympic bronze medalists for South Korea
1961 births
Living people
Olympic medalists in archery
Asian Games medalists in archery
Archers at the 1978 Asian Games
Archers at the 1982 Asian Games
Archers at the 1986 Asian Games
Medalists at the 1984 Summer Olympics
Asian Games gold medalists for South Korea
Asian Games silver medalists for South Korea
Medalists at the 1978 Asian Games
Medalists at the 1982 Asian Games
Medalists at the 1986 Asian Games
Academic staff of Korea National Sport University
20th-century South Korean women